The Exchange Session Vol. 2 is a 2006 album by Kieran Hebden and Steve Reid.

Track listing
 "Hold Down the Rhythms, Hold Down the Machines" – 20:00
 "Noémie" – 17:28
 "We Dream Free" – 16:02

Personnel
Steve Reid – drums and percussion
Kieran Hebden – electronics

References

External links
Kieran Hebden and Steve Reid - official website

2006 albums
Domino Recording Company albums
Albums produced by Kieran Hebden
Collaborative albums